Triacanthus nieuhofii, also known as the silver tripodfish, is a species of marine fish in the family Triacanthidae. It is found in the Indian Ocean and the Western Pacific Ocean.

Distribution
The species is found in the Arabian Sea, the Bay of Bengal, the Andaman Sea, and the South China Sea. It can be found in sandy parts of coastal areas.

Description
The lower half of the body is silvery, while the upper half of the body is darkish. The dorsal fin, the pectoral fin, and the tailfin are all yellow. The species has a total length of 28 cm.

References

Fish described in 1852
Tetraodontiformes